Forlani is an Italian surname, which is a variant of Furlan and Forlán. Notable people with the surname include:

Arnaldo Forlani (born 1925), Italian politician and Prime Minister
Claire Forlani (born 1971), English actress
Kazimir Forlani (1834–1887), Croatian Catholic bishop
Remo Forlani (1927–2009), French writer
Richard Forlani Neely (born 1941), former justice and chief justice of the West Virginia Supreme Court of Appeals from 1973 to 1995
Simone Forlani (born 1974), Italian lightweight rower

Italian-language surnames
Croatian surnames